Agama lucyae is a species of lizard in the family Agamidae. It is a small lizard endemic to Ethiopia.

References

Agama (genus)
Agamid lizards of Africa
Reptiles of Ethiopia
Endemic fauna of Ethiopia
Reptiles described in 2011
Taxa named by Philipp Wagner
Taxa named by Aaron M. Bauer